Neva Again is the debut studio album by West Coast hip hop recording artist Kam. It was released in 1993 via Street Knowledge Records and EastWest Records America. Recording sessions took place at Echo Sound and Paramount Studios in Los Angeles. Production was handled by Torcha Chamba, Solid Scheme, Mr. Woody, T-Bone, Rashad Coes & DJ Pooh. Kam's cousin Ice Cube made his appearance on the album as executive producer and the only guest vocalist,besides Jayo Felony and Yukmouth. The album peaked at number 110 on the Billboard 200 and at number 18 on the Top R&B/Hip-Hop Albums in the United States.

Track listing

Notes
Track 3 contains a sample from "Papa Don't Take No Mess" by James Brown
Track 4 contains a sample from "Sexy Mama" by The Moments
Track 5 contains a sample from "Riding High" by Faze-O
Track 6 contains samples from "Midnight Runaway" by Three Dog Night, "Trouble Man" by Marvin Gaye, "People" by Graham Central Station and "Cosmic Slop" by Funkadelic
Track 7 contains samples from "Flashlight" by Parliament and "Heartbreaker" by Zapp
Track 8 contains samples from "Atomic Dog" by George Clinton and "Play Some Blues" by Roger Troutman

Personnel
Craig A. Miller – main artist
O'Shea Jackson – featured artist (track 11), executive producer
Eddie "Coze Tha Grinch" Goodman – producer (tracks: 1, 5, 10, 12)
Stan "The Guitar Man" Jones – producer (tracks: 1, 5, 10, 12)
Angelo Trotter IV – producer (tracks: 1, 5, 10, 12)
Jesse D. Lars Jr. – producer (tracks: 1, 5, 10, 12)
Chris Charity – producer (tracks: 2, 9)
Derek Lynch – producer (tracks: 2, 9)
James Rashad Coes – producer (tracks: 3, 7)
Terry "T-Bone" Gray – producer (track 4)
Mr. Woody – producer (tracks: 6, 8)
Clarence "D.J. Train" Lars – scratches (track 5)
Mark Jordan – scratches (track 8), producer (track 11)
Brian Gallow – scratches (track 10)
Anthony "Soup" Holmes – keyboards (track 10)
Bob Morse – engineering
Mike Calderon – engineering
Tony Dawsey – mastering
Melanie Nissen – art direction
Richard Bates – design
S. Sung Lee – assistant design
Valerie Wagner – assistant design
Aaron Anderson – management

Charts

References

External links
 

1993 debut albums
Kam (rapper) albums
Atlantic Records albums
Albums produced by DJ Pooh
Political music albums by American artists